Xiangyang National Forest Recreation Area is a forest in Lidao Village, Haiduan Township, Taitung County, Taiwan.

Geography
The forest is located at an altitude of 2,320―2,700 meters above sea level and spans over an area of 362 hectares. It has an annual average temperature of 11.4°C. The main vegetations of the forest are pine trees, masters pine trees and red cypress trees.

Architecture
The forest consists of four trails, which are Xiangyang Trail, Songjing Trail, Xiangsong Trail and Songtao Trail. Two of the trails are connected to Jiaminghu National Trail.

See also
 Geography of Taiwan

References

Geography of Taitung County
National forest recreation areas in Taiwan
Tourist attractions in Taitung County